Luis Nicolás Corvalán Lepe (14 September 1916, in Puerto Montt – 21 July 2010) was a Chilean politician. He served as the general secretary of the Communist Party of Chile (PCCh).

Corvalán joined the Communist Party of Chile at the age of fifteen in the city of Chillán shortly after the fall of the dictatorship of Carlos Ibáñez del Campo in 1932. Trained as a teacher, after 1952 he became an elected member of the PCCh's Central Committee, and after 1958 served as the secretary-general. The party was outlawed from 1948 until 1958.

On 11 September 1973, General Augusto Pinochet led a military coup and Corvalán was among the many arrested. After the murder of Víctor Jara, he was the most prominent political prisoner in Chile. While in prison, Luis Corvalán was awarded the Lenin Peace Prize (for 1973–74). The Soviet Union launched an international campaign for his release and on 18 December 1976, Corvalán was exchanged for a notable Soviet political prisoner, dissident Vladimir Bukovsky, and received asylum in the USSR.

Corvalán headed the Communist Party of Chile – both within Chile and whilst in exile – for over three decades, which covered the whole period of the Pinochet military dictatorship. Corvalán returned to Chile in 1990 after the end of the Pinochet regime.

Works
 The Other Germany – the GDR. Discussions with Margot Honecker, in which Margot Honecker speaks about the history of the German Democratic Republic from her perspective.
 Living Portrayal of Salvador Allende by Luis Corvalan. (Spanish language)

Notes

1916 births
2010 deaths
People from Puerto Montt
Chilean people of Spanish descent
Communist Party of Chile politicians
Senators of the XLIV Legislative Period of the National Congress of Chile
Senators of the XLV Legislative Period of the National Congress of Chile
Senators of the XLVI Legislative Period of the National Congress of Chile
Senators of the XLVII Legislative Period of the National Congress of Chile
Presidency of Salvador Allende
Chilean expatriates in the Soviet Union
People granted political asylum in the Soviet Union
Lenin Peace Prize recipients
Recipients of the Order of Lenin